Paul Alan Campbell (born July 26, 1995) is an American professional baseball pitcher in the Miami Marlins organization. He made his Major League Baseball debut with the Marlins in 2021.

Career

Early career
Campbell graduated from Malden Catholic High School in Malden, Massachusetts, in 2014. He attended Clemson University, where he played college baseball for the Clemson Tigers from 2015 through 2017. The Tampa Bay Rays selected Campbell in the 21st round of the 2017 Major League Baseball draft. Campbell finished 2019 with the Double-A Montgomery Biscuits, pitching to a 8–4 win–loss record and a 3.36 earned run average (ERA) with 63 strikeouts across  innings pitched in 16 appearances. Through the 2019 season, Campbell had a career 3.12 ERA through  minor league innings in three years in the Rays' minor league system.

Miami Marlins
The Miami Marlins selected Campbell from the Rays in the 2020 Rule 5 draft. Campbell made the Marlins' Opening Day roster for the 2021 season. On April 3, 2021, Campbell made his MLB debut in relief against the Tampa Bay Rays. He started his first MLB game on May 1. On May 3, 2021, Campbell was suspended 80 games after violating MLB's Joint Drug Prevention and Treatment Program, testing positive for Dehydrochlormethyltestosterone. Campbell made 16 appearances for Miami in 2021, pitching to a 2–3 record and 6.41 ERA with 26 strikeouts in  innings pitched.

On May 27, 2022, Campbell was placed on the 60-day injured list with a right elbow strain. On August 30, it was announced that Campbell had undergone Tommy John surgery and would miss the 2022 season as well as most of the 2023 season. He was outrighted off the 40-man roster on November 6, 2022.

See also
List of Major League Baseball players suspended for performance-enhancing drugs
Rule 5 draft results

References

External links

1995 births
Living people
Sportspeople from Malden, Massachusetts
American sportspeople in doping cases
Baseball players from Massachusetts
Major League Baseball pitchers
Miami Marlins players
Clemson Tigers baseball players
Gulf Coast Rays players
Hudson Valley Renegades players
Bowling Green Hot Rods players
Charlotte Stone Crabs players
Montgomery Biscuits players
Jacksonville Jumbo Shrimp players